A penumbral lunar eclipse took place at the Moon's descending node of the orbit on Tuesday, August 26, 1980, the last of three penumbral lunar eclipses in 1980 with a penumbral magnitude of 0.70891. This subtle penumbral eclipse may have been visible to a skilled observer at maximum eclipse. 70.891% of the Moon's disc was partially shaded by the Earth (none of it was in total shadow), which caused a gentle shadow gradient across its disc at maximum; the eclipse as a whole lasted 3 hours,  34 minutes and 26 seconds.

Visibility

Related lunar eclipses

Eclipses in 1980 
 A total solar eclipse on Saturday, 16 February 1980.
 A penumbral lunar eclipse on Saturday, 1 March 1980.
 A penumbral lunar eclipse on Sunday, 27 July 1980.
 An annular solar eclipse on Sunday, 10 August 1980.
 A penumbral lunar eclipse on Tuesday, 26 August 1980.

Lunar year series

Half-Saros cycle
A lunar eclipse will be preceded and followed by solar eclipses by 9 years and 5.5 days (a half saros). This lunar eclipse is related to two partial solar eclipses of Solar Saros 154.

See also 
List of lunar eclipses
List of 20th-century lunar eclipses

Notes

External links 
 

1980-08
1980 in science
August 1980 events